The Broken Line is a Canadian sports drama film, directed by Louis Choquette and released in 2008. The film stars David Boutin and Guillaume Lemay-Thivierge as Sébastien Messier and Danny Demers, lifelong friends and competitive boxers whose relationship and career is tested when they accidentally hit a bicyclist with their car after a night of excess partying.

The cast also includes Fanny Mallette, Jacynthe René, Benoît Gouin, Steve Laplante and Germain Houde.

The film received a Genie Award nomination for Best Sound Editing (Robert LaBrosse, France Lévesque, Guy Francoeur, Lucie Fortier, Lori Paquet) at the 29th Genie Awards, and a Jutra Award nomination for Best Cinematography (Ronald Plante) at the 11th Jutra Awards.

References

External links

2008 films
2008 drama films
Canadian drama films
Canadian boxing films
Quebec films
Films shot in Quebec
Films set in Quebec
French-language Canadian films
2000s Canadian films